The Delhi-class destroyers are guided-missile destroyers of the Indian Navy. Three ships of this class are in active service. The Delhi-class vessels were the largest vessels to be built in India at the time of their commissioning. The ships were built by Mazagon Dock Limited (MDL) at a cost of  each.

Development
The design and development of the ship class began as "Project 15" in 1980. A Soviet offer in 1983 for reversible gas turbines and modern weapon systems forced a redesign of the ships from 3,500 tonne frigates to 6,300 tonne destroyers. Directorate of Naval Design completed the design around the mid 1980s. Model tests were carried out at SSPA, Sweden in 1985 and parallelly at Krylov Institute, Soviet Union in 1986. Severnoye Design Bureau provided design inputs for weapons and propulsion packages. The mutual interface suppression system for electromagnetic compatibility was supplied by the Soviets. The break-up of Soviet Union affected the supply of weapon systems, contributing to a three-year delay in the construction of vessels.

Design and description

Delhi class has been described as a stretched  with some elements incorporated from Godavari-class frigates and s. The fore funnel is placed on the port side, while the aft funnel is placed on the starboard. The propulsion system consists of two Zorya-Mashproekt M36E gas turbine plants driving two controllable-pitch propellers. Each gas turbine plant comprises two DT-59 reversible gas turbines connected to an RG-54 gearbox in a combined gas and gas system and is placed in a separate engine room. The vessels are equipped for operation in a nuclear, biological and chemical warfare environment. Delhi-class vessels are fitted with flag facilities, enabling them to act as command unit in task groups.  features better air conditioning facilities to correct heat dissipation issues encountered while operationalising .

Armament

For air defence role, Delhi class is fitted with 9K-90 Uragan (NATO: SA-N-7 Gadfly) air-defence system comprising a pair of 3S-90 single-arm launchers and 9M38M1 Shtil missiles. One launcher is installed forward of the bridge and the other atop the dual helicopter hangar. Each launcher carries a 24 missile magazine for a total of 48 rounds. The missiles have  range and feature semi-active radar homing. MR-775 Fregat-MAE (NATO: Half Plate) radar provides target designation and six MR-90/3R-90 Orekh (NATO: Front Dome) illuminators are used for fire control. The system can track twelve targets and engage a maximum of six tracked targets simultaneously. Last-ditch missile defence is provided by AK-630-based close-in weapon system, while Delhi and Mysore have been upgraded with an additional IAI/Rafael Barak 1 point defence missile system. Mumbai has four AK-630 rotary cannons surrounding the aft mast, which are guided by two MR-123-02 (NATO: Bass Tilt) fire-control radars. In Delhi and Mysore, the two AK-630 mounts ahead of the aft mast have each been replaced by pair of eight-cell Barak 1 vertical launch systems, for a total of 32 missiles. A Signaal LW08 radar license produced by BEL as RAWL provides long range air search capability.

The surface missile battery of Delhi class includes 16 Kh-35E Uran missiles placed in four quadruple sloped launchers. The missiles feature active radar homing and are guided by a Granit Garpun B (NATO: Plank Shave) fire-control radar. The missile battery was initially intended to be eight 3M80E Moskit cruise missiles as evidenced by large blast deflectors present on the lead ship, INS Delhi. A single AK-100 gun guided by MR-184/MR-145 fire-control system (NATO: Kite Screech), which comprises T-91E radar and Kondensor electro-optical sights, is also fitted.

A quintuple  trainable torpedo launcher capable of firing SET 65E active/passive homing torpedo and Type 53–65 wake homing torpedo is placed in between the funnels. Detection is provided by BEL HUMVAD, an indigenous hull-mounted sonar with a variable depth transducer that offers better performance in the waters around India. An Indal Model 15-750 handling system manufactured by GRSE is used to deploy the variable depth sonar of HUMVAD. The final ship of the class, is fitted with an improved ASW suite consisting of BEL HUMSA hull-mounted sonar and Thales ATAS towed array sonar.

The electronic warfare suite originally consisted of BEL Ajanta Mk 2 for electronic support measures, Elettronica TQN-2 jammer and two PK-2 chaff launchers of Russian origin. The Ajanta Mk 2 system was later replaced by Ellora, which has an additional capability to provide electronic countermeasures. BEL Shikari combat display and management system, a derivative of Italian IPN-10, integrates weapon systems of diverse origin. Each vessel can carry two Westland Sea King Mk 42B helicopters. The helicopters carry a surface search radar, a dipping sonar, A244-S lightweight torpedoes and Sea Eagle anti-ship missiles. Samahé helicopter handling system is fitted on all vessels.

Modernisation

As of April 2022, Mumbai is undergoing a mid-life refit that includes upgrades for several weapons and sensors. The Kh-35E Uran missiles will be replaced by BrahMos missiles, which was originally sanctioned in 2015 for two ships of this class. The Shtil-1 air defence system will replace the 9K-90 Uragan, with Fregat M2EM radar replacing the Fregat-MAE. The Kite Screech fire control system of the AK-100 is being replaced by BEL Lynx U2. The electronics warfare system will be upgraded to Ellora Mk II, with Kavach decoy launchers. Atlas Elektronik ACTAS towed-array sonar will be installed on all three ships.
INS Delhi (D61) is back in service after receiving its upgrades, recently BrahMos missile was tested from its new sloped Launchers.

Relocation

The Delhi-class destroyers will be re-based to the Eastern Naval Command, Visakhapatnam.

Ships of the class

Gallery

See also
 List of active Indian Navy ships
 List of destroyers of India
 List of naval ship classes in service

References

External links
 Delhi Class Destroyer – Bharat Rakshak
 GlobalSecurity page on the Delhi class

Destroyer classes
 
Destroyers of the Indian Navy
Ships built in India